Treacle Walker is a book by Alan Garner published on October 28, 2021 by HarperCollins.

Plot 
The story is about a young boy Joseph Coppock who squints at the world with his lazy eyes. He lives alone in his old house. He plays with his marbles, collects birds' eggs and reads comics.

One day, rag-and-bone man Treacle Walker appears who was exchanging donkey stone and an empty jar of all disease medicine for lamb's shoulder blades and a pair of Coppock's pajamas then, a mysterious friendship develops between them.

Awards 

 Shortlisted for 2022 Booker Prize
 Shortlisted for British Fantasy Award for Best Novella

Critical reception 
Sam Leith of The Daily Telegraph gave 5 out of 5 ratings, Anna Robinson of The Conversation wrote it "best fiction of 2022", Shubhangi Tiwari of Scroll.in wrote "Treacle Walker is a book as endearing as it is awe-inspiring, and a testament not only to the wisdom of age, but also to the power of attuning the novel to a space of possibility over truth." and Pauline Kim of The Michigan Daily wrote "Alan Garner's "Treacle Walker" might just be the strangest book I've ever read.".

The book has been also reviewed by Susie Goldsbrough of The Times, Max Liu of The i, Justine Jordan of The Guardian, Maureen Kincaid Speller of Strange Horizons, Alyssa Woo of The Straits Times, Alex Preston of The Guardian, Karthik Keramalu of The New Indian Express, Carolyne Larrington of The Times Literary Supplement, Simon Demetriou of Cyprus Mail and Felix Taylor of Literary Review.

References 

2021 novels
Novels by Alan Garner
HarperCollins books